Moechotypa suffusa is a species of beetle in the family Cerambycidae. It was described by Pascoe in 1862. It is known from China, Cambodia, Thailand, Laos, and Vietnam.

References

suffusa
Beetles described in 1862